La Guajira Terrane (TLG) is one of the geological provinces (terranes) of Colombia. The terrane, dating to the Late Cretaceous, is situated on the North Andes Plate and borders the Caribbean, Tahamí and Chibcha Terranes along the Bucaramanga-Santa Marta Fault. The southern boundary is formed by the Oca Fault with the Chibcha Terrane.

Subdivision

Complexes 

Alto Guajira
 Macuira
 Etpana

Macuira Tahamí Terrane
 Jonjoncito
 Ipapure
 Ipapure-Cerro La Teta

Sierra Nevada de Santa Marta
 Taganga (Taganga)
 Rodadero
 Gaira (Gaira)
 Ciénaga
 Santa Marta Batholith
 Bolívar Batholith
 Socorro Stock
 Latal Pluton
 Los Clavos
 Río Sevilla
 San Lorenzo
 San Pedro de la Sierra
 Buritacá
 Río Oríhueca
 Los Mangos - basement

Ranges 
 Sierra Nevada de Santa Marta
 Macuira

Basins 
 La Guajira

Faults 
bounding faults in bold

 Bucaramanga-Santa Marta (BSF)
 Oca
 Cuisa

Gallery

See also 

 List of earthquakes in Colombia
 List of fossiliferous stratigraphic units in Colombia
 List of mining areas in Colombia
 Geology of the Eastern Hills of Bogotá
 Basin history of the Cesar-Ranchería Basin
 Basin history of the Cocinetas Basin
 Middle Magdalena Valley (VMM)

References

Bibliography

Terranes

La Guajira Terrane

Reports

Maps 
 
 
 
 
 
 

Terranes
Geology of Colombia
Cretaceous Colombia
Late Cretaceous South America
Terranes
Terranes
Terranes